or the "Great Western Temple" is a Buddhist temple that was once one of the powerful Seven Great Temples in the city of Nara, Nara Prefecture, Japan. The temple was first established in AD 765 as a counterpart to Tōdai-ji and it is the main temple of the  sect of Buddhism after the sect's founder, took over administration in 1238. It has undergone several reconstruction efforts since then during the succeeding centuries.

One building, the Aizen-dō, houses a statue of Aizen Myō-ō, while the main image is of Shakyamuni Buddha, erected by Eison in 1249.

Building list 
Main Hall (Hondō – 本堂) – Important Cultural Property. It was rebuilt in 1808.
Shiō-dō (四王堂) – It was rebuilt in 1674.
Aizen-dō (愛染堂) – It was reconstructed in 1762.

See also
 For an explanation of terms concerning Japanese Buddhism, Japanese Buddhist art, and Japanese Buddhist temple architecture, see the Glossary of Japanese Buddhism.
List of National Treasures of Japan (crafts-others)
List of National Treasures of Japan (paintings)
List of National Treasures of Japan (sculptures)
List of National Treasures of Japan (writings)
 Nanto Shichi Daiji, Seven Great Temples of Nanto.
Thirteen Buddhist Sites of Yamato

References

External links
 

Religious organizations established in the 8th century
Buddhist temples in Nara, Nara
Shingon Ritsu temples
Historic Sites of Japan
Important Cultural Properties of Japan
8th-century establishments in Japan
Buddhism in the Nara period
Religious buildings and structures completed in 765